Urge may refer to:

Entertainment
 Urge (film), a 2016 film
The Urge (1987–2005), St. Louis, Missouri, USA Rock/Ska band
"Urge" (song), the second and last single released from Endless Nameless album by The Wildhearts
 Urge (album), a 1966 album by American trumpeter Ted Curson
 The Urge (album), a 1991 album released by bassist Stuart Hamm

Other uses
 HMS Urge, a 1940 lost World War II British submarine
Sucking urge, an infant's instinctive urge to breastfeed
 Nissan URGE, a concept car announced by Nissan that will be integrated with the Xbox video game console
 Urge (digital music service), a defunct online music service
 Urge (drink), a citrus soft drink produced in Norway, equivalent of Surge
 Urge, Pärnu County, Estonia
 Urge, Rapla County, Estonia

See also
The Sinister Urge (disambiguation)

Urgent (disambiguation)
Urgency (disambiguation)
Urse, a village in Palghar district, Maharashtra, India